Molten Lager is a live album by English rock band the Damned, released in October 1999. It was recorded in Mulhouse, France on 23 June 1994.

The line-up features the Not of This Earth personnel and showcases much of that album and other rare tracks by the Damned. While somewhat obscure, this CD is regarded by many fans and music critics as the best of the Damned's numerous live albums , although it largely ignores the band's goth period in favour of the more punk and rock oriented material. It was recorded straight from the mixing desk to DAT.

Reception 

Jack Rabid, writing for AllMusic, called the album "extremely great-sounding," adding, "Being boogie-rock, it doesn't really sound like the Damned, but it sounds like a fairly kick-ass R&B punk band being fronted by Dave Vanian." However, he felt that the "few old classics this lineup attempts" sound "horrible."

Track listing 

Note
Some editions of the album omit "I Walk the Line" and "That Loving Feeling".

Personnel 
The Damned
 Dave Vanian – vocals
 Kris Dollimore – guitar
 Alan Lee Shaw – guitar, backing vocals
 Rat Scabies – drums
 Moose – bass
Technical
Ralf Lexis – cover, artwork

References 

The Damned (band) live albums
1999 live albums